Pexels is a provider of stock photography and stock footage. It was founded in Germany in 2014 and maintains a library with over 3.2 million free stock photos and videos.

History 
Pexels was founded by twin brothers Ingo and Bruno Joseph in Fuldabrück, Hesse. The brothers started the platform in 2014 with around 800 photos. Since 2015 Daniel Frese is part of the team. The graphic design platform Canva acquired Pexels in 2018.

Business model 
Pexels provides media for online download, maintaining a library that contains over 3.2 million photos and videos, growing each month by roughly 200,000 files. The content is uploaded by the users and reviewed manually. Using and downloading the media is free, the website generates income through advertisements for paid content databases. There is also a donation option for users, and while attribution of the content creator is not required, it is appreciated. Through the merger with Canva, Pexels' database is available in the Canva application. 

Pexels is committed to providing a diverse database, for example by including LGBTQ+ stock content, and through a partnership with Nappy, a platform that focuses on POC content.

License 
Pexels doesn't offer media under CC0 Creative Commons license but has their own set of rules for the use of their photos and footage. Their license does not permit the user to sell unaltered copies of a photo or video, to imply endorsement of their own product by people or brands in the images, or to resell the content on other stock platforms.

Staff 
The Pexels staff consists of the three founders, who live in Berlin, Germany, and a team of 40 who are based in Germany, other parts of Europe, and North and South America. The company does not have headquarters, all staff work from their respective homes. Bruno and Ingo Joseph were CEOs until November 2018, when Clifford Obrecht, founder of Canva, became CEO of the company. Bruno Joseph was reinstated as CEO in July 2020.

External links

See also 

 List of stock footage libraries
 List of online image archives

References 

Stock photography 
Online databases